Denys Khomutov (Ukrainian: Денис Олександрович Хомутов; born 7 August 1979) is a Ukrainian retired footballer who current football manager.

Career
Khomuov started his senior career with Shakhtar Donetsk. In 2000, he signed for Oleksandriya in the Ukrainian First League, where he made thirty-three league appearances and scored two goals. After that, he played for Zirka Kropyvnytskyi, Nyva Vinnytsia, Stal Alchevsk, Olimpik Donetsk, and Spartak Sumy.

Personal life
His son Vladyslav Khomutov is also a football player.

References

External links 
 Denis Khomutov: "Money should be invested in children"
 Denis Khomutov's philosophy and belief: such a thing will not happen in Telavi! 
 Olympic coach: “If everyone sees only the end of the game with the Carpathians, then I can imagine how much noise there will be”
 Denis Khomutov: Dynamo is stronger
 Khomutov: I am confident that the Olympic Academy will develop in the right direction 

1979 births
Living people
Sportspeople from Donetsk
Ukrainian footballers
Ukrainian Premier League players
Ukrainian football managers
Ukrainian expatriate football managers
Association football midfielders
FC Gagra managers
FC Telavi managers
Expatriate football managers in Georgia (country)
Ukrainian expatriate sportspeople in Georgia (country)
Expatriate football managers in Estonia
Ukrainian expatriate sportspeople in Estonia
FC Oleksandriya players
FC Zirka Kropyvnytskyi players
FC Nyva Vinnytsia players
FC Stal Alchevsk players
FC Olimpik Donetsk players
FC Spartak Sumy players
FC Shakhtar-2 Donetsk players
FC Shakhtar-3 Donetsk players